Peter Josef von Lindpaintner (8 December 1791 – 21 August 1856) was a German composer and conductor.

Born in Koblenz as the son of a tenor, he studied with Peter Winter and Joseph Graetz. From 1819 onwards he was based in Stuttgart. Some of his early operas were Singspiele, but under the influence of Carl Maria von Weber his interest shifted to Romantic opera.

He died in Nonnenhorn, Bavaria, on Lake Constance.

Works

Operas

Bibliography
 R. Hänsler: Peter Lindpaintner als Opernkomponist (diss., Munich, 1928)
 R. Nägele: Peter Joseph von Lindpaintner: sein Leben, sein Werk (Tutzing, 1993)
 R. Nägele: Peter von Lindpaintner – Briefe (letters, 1809–1856) (Göttingen, 2001)

References
 Clive Brown: "Lindpaintner, Peter Josef von", in The New Grove Dictionary of Opera, ed. Stanley Sadie (London, 1992),

External links

 
 
 List of works, operone.de

1791 births
1856 deaths
19th-century classical composers
19th-century German composers
19th-century German male musicians
German male classical composers
German opera composers
German Romantic composers
Male opera composers
Musicians from Koblenz